This list contains a complete list of all World War I flying aces who flew for the Kingdom of Italy.

A military intelligence committee, the Bongiovanni Commission, verified the aerial victories of Italian aviators during World War I and released its listing of Corpo Aeronautico Militare flying aces on 1 February 1919. The Bongiovanni report served as the basic source for this list. Additions, and later adjustments in victory scores, are cited separately below.

The Bongiovanni Commission list

Footnotes

References
Notes

Bibliography
 

Italy